Bătarci is a commune of 3,612 inhabitants situated in Satu Mare County, Romania. It is composed of four villages: Bătarci, Comlăușa (Ugocsakomlós), Șirlău (Sellő) and Tămășeni (Tamásváralja).

References

Communes in Satu Mare County